Pitthea subflaveola is a moth in the family Geometridae. It was described by George Thomas Bethune-Baker in 1911. It is found in Angola.

The wingspan is about 36 mm. Both wings are sooty black, the forewings with a white spot in the cell and two postmedian ones, the upper one below the costa is quadrangular, while the lower and larger one is wedge-shaped. The hindwings are without markings.

References

Endemic fauna of Angola
Moths described in 1911
Ennominae